Lukáš Kožička (born 15 October 1987) is a Slovak football midfielder who currently plays for MFK Lokomotíva Zvolen.

Club career

FK Senica
He made his professional Corgoň Liga debut for FK Senica against MFK Ružomberok on 5 May 2010.

FO ŽP Šport Podbrezová
He made his professional Fortuna Liga debut for ŽP Šport Podbrezová against ŠK Slovan Bratislava on 11 July 2014.

References

External links
 
 ŽP Šport Podbrezová profile
 Eurofotbal profile

1987 births
Living people
Slovak footballers
Association football midfielders
FK Železiarne Podbrezová players
FK Dukla Banská Bystrica players
FK Senica players
MFK Lokomotíva Zvolen players
Slovak Super Liga players
People from Revúca
Sportspeople from the Banská Bystrica Region